Yehoshua Sobol (born 24 August 1939), is an Israeli playwright, writer, and theatre director.

Biography
Yehoshua Sobol was born in Tel Mond. His mother's family fled the pogroms in Europe in 1922 and his father's family immigrated from Poland in 1934 to escape the Nazis.
Sobol is married to Edna, set and costume designer. They have a daughter, Neta, and a son, Yahli Sobol, a  singer and writer. Sobol studied at the Sorbonne, Paris, and graduated with a diploma in philosophy. Born to a secular Jewish family, he identifies as an atheist.

Theatre career
Sobol's first play was performed in 1971 by the Municipal Theatre in Haifa, where Sobol worked from 1984 to 1988 as a playwright and later assistant artistic director. The performance of his play The Jerusalem Syndrome, in January 1988, led to widespread protests, whereupon Sobol resigned from his post as artistic director.

In 1983, after the Haifa production of his play Weininger's Night (The Soul of a Jew), he was invited to participate in the official part of the Edinburgh Festival. Between 1983 and 1989 Sobol wrote three related plays: Ghetto, Adam and Underground, which constitute together The Ghetto triptich.

Ghetto premiered in Haifa in May 1984. It won the David's Harp award for best play.  That year, Peter Zadek's German version of the play was chosen by Theatre Heute as best production and best foreign play of the year. It has since been translated into more than 20 languages and performed in more than 25 countries. Following Nicholas Hytner's production of the English-language version by David Lan at the Royal National Theatre of Great Britain in 1989, the play won the Evening Standard and the London Critics award for Best Play of the Year and was nominated for the Olivier Award in the same category. It was coldly received in New York, however. In his review of the play in the New York Times, Frank Rich described it as a "tedious stage treatment of the Holocaust."

Since 1995, Sobol has collaborated with Viennese director Paulus Manker on a number of projects exploring new forms of the theatrical experience.

In 1995, Der Vater (The Father)  a work by Niklas Frank and Joshua Sobol commissioned for the Wiener Festwochen (Vienna Festival)  opened at the Theatre an der Wien under the direction of  Paulus Manker. The play is about Niklas Frank's father, Hans Frank, who was Hitler’s Governor general in Poland and was hanged in Nuremberg in 1946. In 1996, they created  Alma for the Wiener Festwochen. Alma is a polydrama based on the life of Alma Mahler-Werfel. It played in Vienna for six successive seasons and toured to Venice, Lisbon, Los Angeles, Berlin, Jerusalem and Prague. In the Vienna production, the scenes of Alma’s life were performed simultaneously on all floors and in all rooms of a former Jugendstil sanatorium near Vienna. The guests were invited to abandon the immobilised position of spectator in a conventional drama, replace it with the mobile activity of traveller, thus partaking in a "theatrical journey". By choosing the events, the path, and the person to follow after each event, each participant constructed her or his personal version of the "Polydrama". In 2000, Sobol and Manker created F@LCO – A CYBER SHOW, a multimedia musical about the Austrian pop singer Falco. Staged in the former Varieté theatre Ronacher in Vienna, F@LCO offered the audience a choice between a more expensive, passive ticket for the boxes or the balconies, from which spectators could only watch the show from distance, or a cheap, "active" ticket on the floor, close to the rostrum (in the shape of @, the Internet at symbol) on which the show was performed. This position allowed the active spectator to move around during the show, dance and buy drinks at the bars installed under the catwalks.

Plays
 
1971  THE DAYS TO COME – Haifa Municipal Theatre
1973  STATUS QUO VADIS – Haifa Municipal Theatre
1974  SYLVESTER 72 – Haifa Municipal Theatre
1975  THE JOKER – Haifa Municipal Theatre
1976  The Night of the Twentieth (Hebrew: ליל העשרים) Haifa Municipal Theatre
1976  NERVES – Haifa Municipal Theatre
1977  TENANTS – Haifa Municipal Theatre
1977  GOG & MAGOG SHOW – Zavta Cultural Club, Tel Aviv
1977  REPENTANCE – Zavta Cultural Club, Tel Aviv
1978  HOMEWARD ANGEL – Habima
1979  WEDDING NIGHT – Habima
1980  THE LAST WORKER – Beit Leissin Theatre, Tel Aviv
1981  WARS OF THE JEWS – Jerusalem Khan Theatre
1982  WEININGER'S NIGHT – Haifa Municipal Theatre
1984  GHETTO (Hebrew: גטו) Haifa Municipal Theatre; FREIE VOLKSBUHNE, Berlin
1984  PASODOBLE – Zavta Cultural Club, Tel Aviv
1985  PALESTINIAN GIRL – Haifa Municipal Theatre
1986  COUNTDOWN – Zavta Cultural Club, Tel Aviv
1987  Jerusalem Syndrome (Hebrew: סינדרום ישרולים) – Haifa Municipal Theatre
1989  ADAM – Habima
1991  UNDERGROUND – YALE REP. NEW HAVEN, USA
1991  SOLO – DE APPEL – THE HAGUE; Habima
1991  A&B – Dortmund
1991  EYE TO EYE – Mannheim (1994)
1992  RING TWICE – Royal National Theatre, Oslo 1997
1993  NICE TONI – Düsseldorfer Schauspielhaus, June 1994
1993  LOVE FOR A PENNY – ISRAELI YIDDISH THEATRE, 1994
1993  SCHNEIDER AND SHUSTER – BASEL 1994; Gorki Theater, Berlin
1994  THE MASKED BALL – Haifa Municipal Theatre (2001)
1994  BLOODY NATHAN – Volkstheater Wien, Vienna, 1996
1995  THE FATHER Wiener Festwochen, 1995.
1995  VILLAGE – Gesher Theatre, Tel Aviv (February 1996)
1996  ALMA – Vienna Festival Week, Vienna (1996)
1996  Honey (Hebrew: דבש) Haifa Municipal Theatre (1997)
1997  MA NI MA MAMA – Zavta Cultural Club, Tel Aviv, Festival of One Act Plays 97.
1997  HOME CINEMA Not yet produced
1998  Strangers (Hebrew: זרים) Habima (1999)
1999  FALCO RONACHER THEATER, Vienna, April 1, 2000
1999  LA TORANA (Not yet produced)
2000  Gebirtig (Hebrew: גבירטיג) based on Mordechai Gebirtig – Yiddishpiel (2000)
2000  17 TOP COMPAGNIETHEATER, Amsterdam 2002
2001  CROCODILES Herzliya Theatre (November 2001)
2002  HOMELESS BEN GURION
2002  iWitness (Hebrew: עד ראייה; lit. "eyewitness") based on the story of Franz Jägerstätter – Cameri Theater (2002)
2002  REAL TIME

Directing
 
GHETTO in Essen and Bremen, Germany
GOLDBERG VARIATIONS, by George Tabori, Dortmund, Germany, 1993
ADAM – in Manheim, Germany, 1993.
SCHNEIDER AND SHUSTER – Basel Theatre, Switzerland, 1994
NICE TONI – The Khan & The Jerusalem Theatre, September 1994
GHETTO – Hartke Theatre, Washington D.C., 1995
GENS [A comprehensive version of the Ghetto Triptych] – Weimar 1995
GHETTO – Haifa Municipal Theatre, January 1998
ALMA – Cameri Theatre, Tel Aviv, December 1998
GHETTO – Wesleyan University Theatre, November 2000
THE MERCHANT OF VENICE – Illinois Shakespeare Festival. 2002

Teaching 
1972–84 Actors Training School, Seminar Hakibutzim – Lecturer on Aesthetics
1972–84 Beit Zvi Actors Training School – Workshop Director: Writing Drama
1995–2002 Tel Aviv University – Workshop Director: Writing Drama
1997–98 Ben Gurion University, Beer Sheva – Lectures on Drama; Workshop: Writing Drama
1996–99 Sam Spiegel Film & TV School, Jerusalem – Script Writing Workshop
2000 Wesleyan University, Connecticut, USA – Documentary drama
2001 Tel Aviv University, Department of Literature – Lectures on Modern and contemporary Theatre
2001–02
2003  Bezalel School of Architecture – Ethics and Art
Ben Gurion University Beer Sheva
2012 University of Washington – Guest Faculty: Playwriting

Published works
(partial list)
2000  Silence– A Novel – published by The New Library, Tel Aviv
2001  Schweigen (Silence) – Published by Luchterhand Literaturverlag, Munich
2002  The Masked Ball – play (Hebrew) – Published by Or – Am, Tel Aviv
2002  Swijgen (Silence) – Published by Byblos, Amsterdam
1999  Alma – play (Hebrew) – Published by Or – Am, Tel Aviv
1998  Alma – play (German) – Published by Paulus Manker, Vienna
1998  Palestinian Girl (English) – Published by Loki Books, London
1996  Village – play (Hebrew) – Published by Or – Am, Tel Aviv
1994  Solo – play (French & English) – Published by Cierec, Saint Etienne
1991  Solo – play (Hebrew) – Published by Or – Am, Tel Aviv
1991  Weininger's Night – play – Published by Cahiers Bernard Lazare, Paris
1990  Underground – play (Hebrew) – Published by Or – Am, Tel Aviv
1990  Night of the 20th – play (Hebrew) – Published by Or – Am, Tel Aviv
1989  Adam – play (Hebrew) – Published by Or – Am, Tel Aviv
1989  Ghetto – play (English) – Published by Nick Hern Books, London
1988  Weiningers Nacht - play (German) – Published by Paulus Manker, Vienna
1987  The Jerusalem Syndrome – play (Hebrew) – Published by Or – Am, Tel Aviv
1985  The Palestinian Girl – play (Hebrew) – Published by Or – Am, Tel Aviv
1984  Ghetto – play (Hebrew) – Published by Or – Am, Tel Aviv
1982  Soul of a Jew – play (Hebrew) – Published by Or – Am, Tel Aviv
1976  Night of the Twentieth – play, (Hebrew) – Published by Proza, Tel Aviv

Awards
 1976 – NIGHT OF THE TWENTIETH – David's Harp Award – Best Play of the Year
 1976 – NIGHT OF THE TWENTIETH – David Pinski Award
 1979  HOMEWARDS ANGEL – David's Harp Award – Israel's Best Play of the Year
 1980  THE LAST WORKER – David's Harp Award – Israel's Best Play of the year
 1982  WEININGER’S NIGHT – David's Harp Award – Israel's Best Play of the Year
 1983  WEININGER’S NIGHT – Meskin Award for Best Play of the Year
 1984  GHETTO – David's Harp Award – Israel's Best Play of the Year
 1985  GHETTO – Theater Heute German Critics’ Choice – Best Foreign Play
 1986  THE PALESTINIAN GIRL – Issam Sirtawi Award
 1989  GHETTO – The Evening Standard award for Best Play of the Year. London
 1989  GHETTO – Critics' Circle Theatre Awards – Best New Play
 1990  GHETTO – Laurence Olivier Awards – Award Nomination – Best Play
 1995  GHETTO – Mainichi Art Prize – Best play of the year – Tokyo, Japan
 1996  GHETTO – Yumiuri Shimbun Grand Prize best play of the year, Tokyo, Japan
 1996  GHETTO – Yoshiko Yuasa Prize – Best play of the year. Tokyo, Japan
 2001  SILENCE – Sapir Award Nomination – Best Novel of the Year

See also
Culture of Israel

References

External links
 
 Biographical notes on the ALMA website Text of this site served for the basic Wikipedia entry, done with permission of Joshua Sobol and Paulus Manker.
 Interview with Sobol on "Polydrama"

1939 births
Israeli male dramatists and playwrights
Living people
Jewish dramatists and playwrights
People from Tel Mond
University of Paris alumni
Wesleyan University faculty
Israeli theatre directors
Oranim Academic College alumni
Israeli people of Polish-Jewish descent
Israeli atheists
Jewish atheists